Arne Højme (14 June 1884 – 17 April 1967) was a Danish racewalker. He competed in the men's 3500 metres walk at the 1908 Summer Olympics.

References

1884 births
1967 deaths
Athletes (track and field) at the 1908 Summer Olympics
Danish male racewalkers
Olympic athletes of Denmark
Place of birth missing